Ransom Hooker Gillet (January 27, 1800 – October 24, 1876) was an attorney and politician from New York. A Jacksonian and later a Democrat, he was most notable for his service in the  United States House of Representatives from 1833 to 1837.

Biography
Gillet was born in New Lebanon, New York on January 27, 1800, the son of John and Lucy Gillet. He pursued an academic course, then studied law with Silas Wright in Canton, New York. He was admitted to the bar in 1822 and commenced practice in Ogdensburg, New York. Active in the New York State Militia from 1827 to 1837, Gillet attained the rank major as inspector of the 49th Brigade. From 1830 to 1833 Gillet served as Ogdensburg's postmaster. He was a delegate to the 1832 Democratic National Convention.

Gillet was elected as a Jacksonian to the Twenty-third and Twenty-fourth Congresses (March 4, 1833 – March 3, 1837). He was not a candidate for re-nomination in 1836. Gillet served as a federal commissioner to negotiate with New York's Indian tribes from 1837 to 1839. He was a delegate to the 1840 Democratic National Convention.

On April 1, 1845 Gillet was appointed Register of the United States Treasury and he served until May 27, 1847, when he was appointed Solicitor of the United States Treasury. He continued as solicitor until October 31, 1849. In 1855, Gillet was appointed Assistant United States Attorney General and he served from 1855 to 1858. In 1858, he was appointed Solicitor of the U.S. Court of Claims, and he served until 1861.

Retirement and death
Gillet retired from public life in 1867 and authored several books, including a two-volume biography of Silas Wright. He died in Washington, D.C., October 24, 1876. He was interred in Glenwood Cemetery.

Family
In 1825, Gillet he married Eleanor C. Barhydt (1806-1881). They were married until his death and were the parents of a son, Silas Wright Gillet (1829-1878). Silas W. Gillet was a graduate of Georgetown University and served in the United States Marine Corps during the American Civil War. He later resided in New Lebanon, where he served in local offices including town justice and school board member.

References

External links

1800 births
1876 deaths
19th-century American politicians
People from New Lebanon, New York
New York (state) lawyers
United States Department of the Treasury officials
Burials at Glenwood Cemetery (Washington, D.C.)
Jacksonian members of the United States House of Representatives from New York (state)
Members of the United States House of Representatives from New York (state)